"Superficial Love" is a single by Canadian singer Ruth B. It was originally released on November 27, 2015, alongside her debut EP, then released in a single version on February 24, 2017. It was first previewed in a video on Vine in 2015, which got over 50 million views.

The music video for the song was released on March 31, 2017 on YouTube.

Critical reception 
Mike Wass of Idolator says that "it reminds me of early Leona Lewis with its smooth vocal and contemporary production."

Music video 
The music video for the song was released on March 31, 2017, on Ruth B's Vevo channel on YouTube. As of 
June 2021, the video has over 21 million views.

Charts

Certifications

References 

2015 songs
2017 singles
Canadian pop songs
Columbia Records singles
Ruth B. songs